Brochevarevarura is a 2019 Indian Telugu-language crime comedy film written and directed by Vivek Athreya and produced by Vijay Kumar Manyam under the banner of Manyam Productions. The film features Sree Vishnu, Nivetha Thomas, Nivetha Pethuraj, and Satyadev while Priyadarshi and Rahul Ramakrishna play supporting roles. The music was composed by Vivek Sagar while the cinematography and editing were done by Sai Sriram and Ravi Teja Girijala, respectively.

The film released worldwide on 28 June 2019, and received positive reviews from critics. The film was remade in Hindi as Velle (2021) and in Kannada as Govinda Govinda (2021).

Plot
Vishal is an assistant director, who confirms to launch his debut film, for which he decides approach an actress Shalini for lead role. As his directorial debut being a low budget film and crew are mostly new to the industry, he could not find the contacts to reach out to the big stars. However, Vishal manages to get Shalini's email and sends her a short film of his script. She's impressed by his pilot and gives an appointment to hear his story. They meet in a restaurant where Vishal narrates the plot

High school-college principal Radha Krishna takes his only daughter Mitra to school. There she meets Rahul, Rambabu "Rambo", and Rakesh "Rocky" famous as 'R3' batch who are last benchers and failing their grades for several years. One day they try to steal their answer sheets but they see Mitra sitting in front of the staffroom and were scared as she was the principal's daughter, so Rahul makes up a story about his sick grandmother. But on the next day when the lecturer is showing scores it's revealed that Rakesh kept Rahul's paper in the staffroom so the lecturer would believe that they 3 didn't steal the papers, though the other two ironically thought the same thing and make a fool of themselves in the Physics class. Mitra is just like them, in the aspect that she doesn't have an interest in studying. Instead, she likes classical dance and wants to be a national level dancer. Her parents divorced when she was young and she chose to live with her mother. After her mother passed away she had no other option, but to live with her father. She takes a liking to the R3 gang and starts hanging out with them. Disappointed by her low grades, her father decides to enroll her in a tuition class, which is run by her father's best friend, and later she's forced to do extra tuition. The teacher takes advantage of her and harasses her.

Saddened, she tells her father, but he dismisses it as a pathetic excuse for skipping tuition. Mitra is heartbroken, her father is unable to help her and this makes her question her insecurity. Having no rapport with her father, Mitra decides to run away from home to pursue her career. R3 batch supports her decision, and she devises a perfect plan for them to execute. She hatches a fake plan to get herself kidnapped by R3 and use the money to learn dance and run away from home. The R3 gang follow the plan perfectly and secure 8 lakh from Mitra's father. Later Mitra runs away from home and moves to Hyderabad for living her dream. Meanwhile, R3 gang thrashes the teacher on Mitra's behalf, and unknowingly injure an innocent person. Radha informs his cop friend Srinu and asks him to investigate on R3. Srinu starts the investigation, but considers R3 as innocent. Mitra is excited to perform on stage and invites R3 to watch her performance. She forgets her phone while leaving for the dance studio. She is really kidnapped by real thugs who are even willing to sell her for human trafficking. The thugs contact R3 for money as Mitra tells them that they are her only point of contact.The R3 batch is worried and decides to beg/borrow/steal money to save Mitra.

Vishal narrates half of the plot to Shalini and promises to narrate the rest another day after making some minor developments. Later, Shalini starts travelling with Vishal for the film, and falls for him. One day while narrating to Shalini, Vishal receives a call from his mother, who tells him that his father met with an accident(the innocent person whom RE unknowingly injure). They need 10 lakh for the surgery, and Shalini helps him out with the money. She gets the money from the bank by one of her agents, and drives Vishal to his father with the money. Meanwhile, Rocky, who was at the same bank looking for potential withdrawals of high amounts of money so that they could steal, finds this as a good opportunity and follows the car to a petrol bunk. Determining the only possible route the car is going to continue on, they pelt a stone on Shalini's car en route, which leads to a car crash and steal the money. Later, Rahul drops his phone which had the thug's contact on it at the crash scene (a mentally challenged person picks it up later). Vishal and Shalini are admitted to a local hospital and Vishal is hesitant to ask Shalini for more money for his father's surgery. Meanwhile, the thugs try to contact Rahul but to no avail. They decide to sell her and start moving to pick up point.

Rahul and Vishal realize that the phone was dropped at the crash site, both race to the crash site and deduce that the mentally challenged must've picked up the phone and start hunting for him in the city. Meanwhile, one of the thugs gifts Mitra's bag to his daughter. R3 and thug's daughter end up in the same auto-rickshaw and realize that it is Mitra's bag. They investigate his daughter for his whereabouts and track him down. Meanwhile, Vishal manages to track down the mentally challenged and chases after him. They all run into each other and on realizing it try to disperse. Rahul contacts the kidnappers to save Mitra, but the kidnappers refuse his deal and delete his contact. While transporting Mitra to their place, Mitra creates havoc in the car of thugs which leads to hit into a motorcycle and end up creating a huge ruckus. This leads to the police trying to document the issue for insurance purposes. They are surprised to discover Mitra and save her. Meanwhile, Vishal's sister informs Vishal that operation was completed successfully. He realizes that Shalini arranged the money again for his father and comes to thank her.

Shalini proposes Vishal, who is confused and Shalini promises to do his film even if he was not ready to accept her proposal. Vishal asks her for some time to think. Then they receive a parcel in the hospital which contains the 10 lakh which was stolen by R3. Srinu makes Radha realize his mistakes while disciplining his daughter. Radha decides to get Mitra back and wholeheartedly apologize to her. Later in the police station Mitra contacts Rahul to pick her up. But Rahul refused and tells her to call Radha, because they have realised they had done a big mistake. Radha is the correct person to handle the situation for setting right and Rahul hopes all for good. Mitra calls Radha, who receives her warmly in the station. Radha supports his daughter's decision by enrolling her in a classical dance academy and bashing his friend in front of his students. Mitra realised she fell for Rahul and proposes indirectly but Rahul did not understand her intention. Vishal starts his film with Shalini. Finally R3 gang discusses about their useless goals in life.

Cast 

Sree Vishnu as Rahul
Nivetha Thomas as Mithra
Nivetha Pethuraj as Shalini
Satyadev as Vishal
Priyadarshi as Rakesh "Rocky"
Rahul Ramakrishna as Rambabu "Rambo"
Srikanth Iyyengar as Radha Krishna, Mitra's father
Harsha Vardhan as CI Srinu, Radha Krishna's friend
Sivaji Raja as Rahul's father
Shafee as Constable Ashok Kumar
Dinesh Koushika as Soori
Jhansi as a physics teacher
Raj Madiraju as a film producer
Ajay Ghosh as a kidnapper
Chevella Ravi as a beggar
Rajesh Khanna
Appaji Ambarisha Darbha as Vishal's father

Production 
The film was officially launched in August 2018, with Sree Vishnu playing the lead role, marking his second collaboration with director Vivek Athreya after Mental Madhilo (2017). Principal photography commenced very soon after the launch. Later, Nivetha Thomas confirmed their presence in the project, along with Nivetha Pethuraj, who worked with Vishnu in the director's previous film. The production unit completed the first schedule at Guntur in November 2018, and moved to Tenali for the second schedule. The film wrapped up shooting in early March 2019.

Soundtrack 

The soundtrack album featured seven songs composed by Vivek Sagar with lyrics by Ramajogayya Sastry, Hasith Goli, Bharadwaj and Krishna Kanth. The film's first single "Vagalaadi" was released on 30 April 2019. The second single track "Doragiri" was released later on 5 May 2019. The third single track "Putukku Zara Zara" which released on 15 May 2019, features traditional lyrics from "Pannendu Metla Kinnera" written by Shri Dasari Ranga in Kalaa Telanganam. The fourth song "Talapu Talupu" was released on 20 May 2019. The full soundtrack album was released by Aditya Music on 24 May 2019.

The album received positive reviews, with critics noting the mix of folksy-street tunes with the classical-contemporary notes. Neetishta Nyayapati of The Times of India, stated that "The album of Brochevarevarura has something for everyone for sure. The OST doesn’t just serve the purpose of delivering hummable songs; it also gives an insight into the kind of film it’s going to be. Apart from the vocalists, Vivek Sagar’s guitar sets the tone for most of the numbers and effectively so. While Vagalaadi is a crowd favourite and will remain so, give the rest of the numbers a chance this weekend if you’re in the mood for some good music."

Release 
The official title logo was released on 31 December 2018, coinciding with the occasion of New Year's Eve. On 15 March 2019, the team released the 1-minute video teaser, titled Visual Tale, which reveals the plot line and characters through caricatures. The film's first look poster which features Sree Vishnu, Rahul Ramakrishna and Priyadarshi Pullikonda, was released on 21 March 2019, coinciding with Holi. Another first look poster featuring Nivetha Thomas, was released on 30 March 2019. The official teaser was unveiled on 20 April 2019. The film's pre-release event was held at Hyderabad on 22 June 2019, featuring the presence of the cast and craw along with Ram Pothineni and Nara Rohith as the chief guests. The film released worldwide on 28 June 2019.

Reception 
Brochevaruevarura received positive response from critics. The News Minute gave 3 out of 5 stars and wrote "Brochevarevaru Ra floats on impossible coincidences, and plays with incidents, which probably would play out in real life in one in a million circumstances. Things end conveniently, as they are likely to happen in such high-stakes-plan-gone-wrong kind of stories. However, this shouldn't be a cause for concern. The director doesn't dig a hole too deep for logic and makes sure the narrative pans out as a freakish set of events that are nevertheless, a lot of fun to follow." Y Sunita Chowdhary of The Hindu wrote "This simple, light-hearted story of friends is worth the time and money." Neetishta Nyayapati of The Times of India gave 3 out of 5 stars stating "Go watch Brochevarevaru Ra if crime comedy, coming-of-age films and comic capers are your cup of tea because Vivek Athreya’s film delivers all that and more. Just don’t expect the usual commercial elements or even a love story thrown in, for you will be left disappointed. Watch this one for the freshness and laidback-ness of it all and you will love it."

Sankeerthana Varma of Film Companion wrote "Brochevarevarura populates itself with great characters and places them in circumstances where they can shine their eclectic light at us". Cinema Express gave the film a rating of 3.5 out of 5 and stated "This is a well-written and a well-rounded film, which plays around in the sandbox of human emotions." Venkat Arikatla from Greatandhra gave the film 3 out of 5 stars and wrote "Brochevarevura is a pretty simple crime comedy that is peppered with interesting screenplay and offers some genuine laughs." 123Telugu gave the film 3.25 out of 5 and stated "Brochevarevarura is a crime comedy which has good fun and entertaining thrills. The fun is generated in a simple manner and keeps you hooked for the most part of the film. The lead cast performance will surely win your hearts. However, things become a bit slow and predictable in the second half but that does not stop you from having a good time watching this film." Indiaglitz gave the film a rating of 2.75 out of 5 and stated 'Brochevarevaru Ra' is a crime comedy. Situational comedy, characterizations, breezy screenplay in the first half are its assets. On the other hand, the second half comes undone with convenient, half-baked writing."

It is considered as one of the "25 Greatest Telugu films of the decade" by Film Companion. It was also listed in the Top 7 best Telugu films of the year 2019 by India Today.

Awards and nominations

Remake 
Brochevarevarura is being remade into multi-languages. In Kannada it is titled as Govinda Govinda directed by debut director Tilak and produced by Shailendra Babu and Ravi R Garini, and stars Sumanth Shailendra, Bhavana and Kavitha Gowda. The Hindi remake rights were bought by Sunny Deol, and stars his son Karan Deol as lead actor. The film is titled Velle, directed by Deven Munjal and featuring Karan Deol, Anya Singh, Abhay Deol and Mouni Roy.

Notes

References

External links
 

2019 films
2010s Telugu-language films
2010s crime comedy films
Indian crime comedy films
2019 comedy films
Telugu films remade in other languages